Mohamed Abdi Ware (born 14 February 1960) is a Somali politician. He was the president of Hirshabelle, assumed office on 16 September 2017.

Biography
Waare hails from the Yabar Madaxweyne sub-clan of Xawaadle, and was born in the Jowhar, Middle Shabelle which at that time in 1960 was part of Banadir region.

Mohamed Abdi Ware received his primary education in Halgan village in Bulo-Burte District, and completed his secondary education in Hodan District in Mogadishu. He received Diploma in Agriculture Extension Services from  [Indiana University Bloomington]He was one of the diploma trainee sent to the United States to boost the country's agricultural services.

He joined the government when he graduated from Afgooye Agricultural High School in 1979. He worked for the Ministry of Agriculture for 10 years, and was the agricultural coordinator for Middle Shabelle and Hiran regions. He worked with the Red Cross for 10 years after the collapse, especially during a time of insecurity and famine in the country. He worked with the United Nations Food and Agriculture Organization. He also worked briefly with UNDP, particularly the Transitional Federal Government (TFG) Reconstruction Project led by President Abdullahi Yusuf Ahmed.

According to Ware, his main tasks as president is to disarm and integrate local clan militias into the state security forces and the construction of the Cadale port and a dry port in Ferfer, Hiiraan.

During his 2018 presidential term, parliament planned his removal from office. Ware resigned on 2 November 2020.

See also
Somalia
Politics of Somalia
Lists of office-holders

References

Presidents of Hirshabelle
Government ministers of Somalia
Somali National University alumni
Living people
1960 births